Michael David Taylor (born December 19, 1985) is an American former professional baseball outfielder. He played in Major League Baseball (MLB) for the Oakland Athletics and Chicago White Sox from 2011 through 2014.

Early life
Taylor was born in Cheverly, Maryland, and graduated from Apopka High School in Apopka, Florida. He played college baseball at Stanford University. In 2006, he played collegiate summer baseball in the Cape Cod Baseball League for the Yarmouth-Dennis Red Sox.

Baseball career

Philadelphia Phillies
Taylor was drafted by the Philadelphia Phillies in the fifth round of the 2007 Major League Baseball Draft out of Stanford University. At the end of the 2009 season, he was one of two players given the Paul Owens Award, for best pitcher and best position player (which went to Taylor) in the Phillies' farm system. He was also selected as the Eastern League Rookie of the Year while playing for the Reading Phillies.

Oakland Athletics
On December 16, 2009, Taylor was traded to the Toronto Blue Jays with Kyle Drabek and Travis D'Arnaud in exchange for Roy Halladay. The Blue Jays immediately traded him to the Oakland Athletics for Brett Wallace.  He spent the entire 2010 season at Triple-A Sacramento and played in the Arizona Fall League.

On September 2, 2011, Taylor made his major league debut with the Oakland Athletics, batting ninth and playing right field. In total, his brief 2011 stint with the A's included 11 games, 6 hits, 1 HR, 1 RBI and a .200 batting average.

Taylor was designated for assignment by the Athletics on March 29, 2014.

Chicago White Sox
On June 14, the A's traded Taylor to the Chicago White Sox in exchange for right handed pitcher Jake Sanchez. On October 24, 2014 Taylor was outrighted to Triple A and later that same day he elected free agency. On January 22, 2015, Taylor resigned on a minor league deal.

On March 10, 2015, Taylor announced his retirement from baseball.

References

External links

 Baseball Almanac

1985 births
Living people
Oakland Athletics players
Chicago White Sox players
Stanford Cardinal baseball players
Yarmouth–Dennis Red Sox players
Lehigh Valley IronPigs players
Williamsport Crosscutters players
Lakewood BlueClaws players
Clearwater Threshers players
Reading Phillies players
Sacramento River Cats players
Charlotte Knights players
Major League Baseball outfielders
Baseball players from Maryland
People from Cheverly, Maryland
Mat-Su Miners players
African-American baseball players